William Benn may refer to:

William Wedgwood Benn, 1st Viscount Stansgate (1877–1960), British Liberal politician who later joined the Labour Party
William Benn (divine) (1600–1680), English divine
William Benn (Lord Mayor of London) (c. 1682–1755), British merchant